Sergei Igorevich Troyan (born 4 October 1984) is a former Russian professional football player.

Club career
He played in the Russian Football National League for FC Volgar-Gazprom Astrakhan in 2003.

External links
 
 

1984 births
Sportspeople from Astrakhan
Living people
Russian footballers
Association football midfielders
FC Volgar Astrakhan players
FC Rotor Volgograd players
FC Fakel Voronezh players
FC Sokol Saratov players
FC Zenit-Izhevsk players
FC Saturn Ramenskoye players
FC Oryol players